Takayama tuberculata is a species of unarmored dinoflagellates from the genus Takayama, being closely related to T. tasmanica. It was first isolated from the Australian region of the Southern Ocean, just north of the polar front. It is medium-sized and is characterized by its long ovoid cell shape and rather long apical groove. It is considered potentially ichthyotoxic.

References

Further reading 
 Mooney, Ben D., et al. "Survey for karlotoxin production in 15 species of gymnodinioid dinoflagellates (Kareniaceae, Dinophyta) 1." Journal of Phycology45.1 (2009): 164-175.
 Gu, Haifeng, et al. "Morphology, ultrastructure and phylogeny of Takayama xiamenensis sp. nov.(Gymnodiniales, Dinophyceae) from the East China Sea."Phycologia 52.3 (2013): 256-265.

External links 
 
 WORMS

Species described in 2008
Dinophyceae